The Smoking Hills Formation is a geologic formation in Northwest Territories. It preserves fossils dating back to the Cretaceous period.

See also

 List of fossiliferous stratigraphic units in Northwest Territories

References
 

Cretaceous Northwest Territories
Oil shale in Canada
Oil shale formations